Mrs Brown is a  1997 British drama film. It may also refer to:

Mrs. Brown's Boys, an Irish/British TV sitcom
Agnes Browne, a 1999 American/Irish romantic comedy film 
Anna Gordon (ballad collector), Scottish ballad collector (1747–1810)
"Mrs. Leroy Brown", song from Van Lear Rose
 Mrs. Brown book series, written in the 1860s by Arthur Sketchley (pseudonym for George Rose, 1817—1882)

See also
Mister Brown (disambiguation)
"Mrs. Brown, You've Got a Lovely Daughter"